Marlborough was a parliamentary borough centred on the town of Marlborough in Wiltshire, which elected two Members of Parliament (MPs) to the House of Commons from 1295 until 1868, and then one member from 1868 until 1885, when the borough was abolished.

Members of Parliament

1295–1640

1640–1868

1868–1885

Election results

Elections in the 1830s

 The mayor refused to accept the nominations of Malet and Mirehouse, and Bucknall-Estcourt and Bankes were declared elected unopposed.

Elections in the 1840s

Baring was appointed a Lord Commissioner of the Treasury and Bruce was appointed Vice-Chamberlain of the Household, requiring by-elections.

Elections in the 1850s

Brudenell-Bruce was appointed Vice-Chamberlain of the Household, requiring a by-election.

Elections in the 1860s

Seat reduced to one member

Elections in the 1870s

Brudenell-Bruce succeeded to the peerage, becoming Marquess of Ailesbury.

Elections in the 1880s

Bruce was appointed Vice-Chamberlain of the Household, requiring a by-election.

References and sources
References

Sources
Robert Beatson, A Chronological Register of Both Houses of Parliament (London: Longman, Hurst, Res & Orme, 1807) 
D Brunton & D H Pennington, Members of the Long Parliament (London: George Allen & Unwin, 1954)
Cobbett's Parliamentary history of England, from the Norman Conquest in 1066 to the year 1803 (London: Thomas Hansard, 1808) 
F W S Craig, British Parliamentary Election Results 1832–1885 (2nd edition, Aldershot: Parliamentary Research Services, 1989)
 J Holladay Philbin, Parliamentary Representation 1832 – England and Wales (New Haven: Yale University Press, 1965)

Parliamentary constituencies in Wiltshire (historic)
Constituencies of the Parliament of the United Kingdom established in 1295
Constituencies of the Parliament of the United Kingdom disestablished in 1885
Marlborough, Wiltshire
Members of Parliament for Marlborough